Neale's Musick Hall, also known as Mr. Neal's New Musick Hall, Mr. Neale's Great Room, Neal's Musick Room, the Great Musick Hall, Neale's Great Musick Hall or the Fishamble Street Music Hall was a purpose-built music hall that existed on Fishamble Street in Dublin city centre. It was built using subscriptions from a charitable organisation named 'The Charitable and Musical Society', and operated from 1741 until the mid-19th century. William Neale, a local musical instrument-maker and music publisher, was the secretary/treasurer of the society during the conception and construction phase of the project. The building is most notable for the premiere of Handel's Messiah which took place within it on the afternoon of 13 April 1742.

History

Foundation and Handel's Messiah
At the end of the 17th century, convivial impromtu musical meetings were often held in two taverns on Fishamble Street named The George and The Bull's Head by a group, naming itself 'The Bull's Head Musical Society'. In 1707, the erection of the nearby Custom House on Custom House Quay increased the economic profile of the area, with shops, taverns, coffee houses, printers, publishers, theatres and brothels proliferating with the increase of trade and mercantile activity. By 1723, The Bull's Head Musical Society had elected local instrument-maker John Neal (or Neale) as its president. Neal was also a music publisher and in 1724 published the earliest printed collection of Irish music, which included pieces by Irish harpist Turlough O'Carolan. At some point after this, the group renamed themselves as the Charitable and Musical Society and decided to take on the duty of raising funds for insolvent debtors in some of Dublin's notorious debtor's prisons, including The Black Dog. Dublin was home to a number of charitable musical organisations at the time, which would often alter their names slightly whenever they moved their organising committees from one tavern to another. 

The Charitable and Musical Society met every Friday evening, and when a concert was over would typically finish the night with 'catch singing, mutual friendship, and harmony'. It cost five shillings, 'an English crown', to become a member of the society, and had both Catholic and Protestant members, and titled gentlemen as well as artisans. John Neale died in 1737 and was succeeded by his son William, who would be pivotal in the planning and construction of the Musick Hall, built specifically to accommodate concerts for the benefit of the charity. Prior to the society's decision to raise funds for the construction of this dedicated Musick Hall, there had been a venue in the Bull's Head Tavern known as 'the Great Room in Fishamble Street' which offered space for concerts and balls. There had also been another venue known as the Philharmonick Room located on the same street, situated opposite St. John's Church, which had been built for a group known as the Musical Academy for the Practice of Italian Musick (renamed the Philharmonick Society in 1741) as a replacement for their hall on Crow Street. The Bull's Head Tavern itself was the largest cage-work house still standing on the western side of Fishamble Street at the time, and belonged to the Dean and Chapter of nearby Christ Church Cathedral. The society engaged Richard Cassels to build the Musick Hall on a site facing the Bull's Head Tavern. Cassels' commission came more or less at the same time as his contract to design Tyrone House on Marlborough Street in Dublin for Marcus Beresford, 1st Earl of Tyrone.

On 2 October 1741, Neale's Musick Hall was formally opened on Fishamble Street. Accommodating seven hundred people, it was Ireland's largest concert venue. Laurence Whyte, a poet with connections to the Charitable Musical Society, provided the only known description of the internal design of the Music Hall in his 1742 poem entitled 'A Poetical Description of Mr. Neal's New Musick-Hall in Fishamble-street, Dublin'. The poem has been noted by Dr. Michael Griffin of University of Limerick as being "of interest not just to literary historians but also architectural historians". To help defray expenses, the hall was hired out to other organisations and individuals, including two women named Mrs Hamilton and Mrs Walker who organised an 'Assembly' every Saturday evening. Advertisements purchased by the women to promote their assemblies in the press described the venue as "The Charitable Musick Hall in Fishamble-street, which is finished in the genteelest manner". The existence of the two concert halls; Neale's and the Philharmonick Room, solidified Fishamble Street's reputation as the hub of Dublin's serious musical appreciation for the coming decades until 1767 when the Rotunda Room in association with Dr. Mosse's Lying-in Hospital began to compete with it.

Handel's decision to give a season of concerts in Dublin in the winter of 1741–42 arose as a result of an invitation on behalf of the Duke of Devonshire, then serving as Lord Lieutenant of Ireland. According to historian Jonathan Bardon, Handel and the Duke were probably not acquainted, as Devonshire, unlike his viceregal predecessors, did not subscribe to opera in London. It is known, however, that the invitation was ultimately sent at the behest of the Charitable and Musical Society for the Release of Imprisoned Debtors, along with two other recognised charities in the city of Dublin at the time, namely the Charitable Infirmary on Cook Street (founded in 1718) and Mercer's Hospital (founded in 1734). The charities requested only one benefit performance to be made by Handel, while any additional time he chose to spend in Dublin could be filled by organising and directing other concert series for his own benefit. A violinist friend of Handel's, Matthew Dubourg, was serving as the Lord Lieutenant's bandmaster in Dublin; and assured Handel he could look after the tour's orchestral requirements. 

After arriving in Dublin on 18 November 1741, Handel arranged a subscription series of six concerts, to be held between December 1741 and February 1742 at Neale's Great Music Hall, Fishamble Street. These concerts were so popular that a second series was quickly arranged; although Messiah figured in neither series. On 29 December 1741, Handel, in written correspondence with Charles Jennens in England, noted that the hall possessed splendid acoustic properties. Handel gave multiple performances at the hall throughout the early months of 1741-2, but the venue is mostly widely remembered for the premiere of Messiah which took place at noon on 13 April 1742. A repetition performance of Messiah was also held on 3 June 1742. Reflecting the charitable nature of the society, the newspaper adverts for the performance read:
 "For relief of the prisoners in the several gaols, and for the support of Mercer's Hospital in Stephen's Street, and of the Charitable Infirmary on Inn's Quay... will be performed at the Musick Hall in Fishamble Street, Mr Handel's new Grand Oratorio called the Messiah..."

There was such demand for tickets for the initial performances that, in order to maximise space, the organiser's reportedly requested male patrons to leave their swords at home and female patrons not to wear hooped skirts. The popularity of Messiah continued in subsequent years, and the Charitable and Musical Society organised annual performances in the years that followed. 

Handel departed Ireland on 13 August 1742. Before departing Ireland, Handel purchased a new organ for the Musick Hall, which was used for the first time at the opening concert of the second season of the Charitable and Musical Society on 8 October 1742. As of 1912, the organ was in the possession of Lt. Col. G. H. Johnston of Kilmore House, near Richhill, County Armagh. 

By 1750, the Charitable and Musical Society had released 1,200 people from debtors' prison, whose debts and fees were noted to have been in excess of £9,000. In addition to their release, the society also provided each person with a small monetary sum on their release. In 1751, it was noted that William Neale added "a very elegant additional room" to the Musick Hall, for the "comfort of those who attended Balls and Ridottos". The building also became the venue of Lord Mornington's 'Musical Assemblies' in the 1750s and 1760s. William Neale died in December 1769. New music halls were constructed in Dublin in the years that followed, and by 1772 concert life in the city was centred on the new Music Room on the north side of the city. In 1773 and 1774, the Musick Hall was used for lectures, political meetings and Ridotto Balls and on 19 April 1776 was the venue of the first masquerade ball held in Ireland.

Late 18th and 19th centuries
On 19 April 1777, the Musick Hall was repurposed as a theatre by Messrs. Vandermere and Waddy, and renamed as the 'Fishamble Street Theatre'. 

On 6 February 1782, a meeting was held in the grove rooms of the Music Hall by the Corporation of Cutlers, Painters, Paper-Stainers and Stationers to nominate a candidate to represent the city of Dublin in parliament. The grove rooms were situated to the left of the Music Hall stage, and did not form part of the Music Hall, theatre and supper-room complex proper, but an "apartment fitted up in an old house adjoining, on account of the late Masquerades". The guild had held their meetings in the venue since at least 1765, as their Stationer's Hall had been purchased by the Wide Streets Commissioners in 1761 and demolished. Between 300 to 400 people were in attendance. At a point during a speech, the main beam (which was rotten) gave way, leading the congregated crowd to fall 20ft into the hall below. None of the victims appear to have died immediately in the fall, but many were maimed and at least 11 died shortly afterwards due to their injuries. The collapse of the floor led to the cancellation of many upcoming events, led to fears about the structural integrity of the 40-year old building, and contributed to the decline of the Music Hall when compared to the rising popularity of the Rotunda complex built in 1767. 

The venue went through a number of different names over the following decades, including the Sans pareil Theatre and Prince of Wales Theatre until it was closed forever in the public capacity in which it was built on 1 January 1867.

Remaining structures

Shortly after the theatre's closure, the site was bought (in 1868) by Kennan & Sons and some of the structures incorporated into a factory for agricultural implements.

Writing in 1912, Irish musicologist and historian W. H. Grattan Flood noted that the only "outward and visible sign" of the 18th century hall was the entrance gate. By 1990, Kennan & Sons steelworks was still onsite, and it was reported by RTÉ that the only original part of the historic music hall that was still standing was one inside wall of the iron foundry. The entrance gateway, which is a protected structure, was reinforced during the development of nearby apartments, and was rebuilt in March 2000. 

While the National Inventory of Architectural Heritage (NIAH) does not record when the majority of the music hall building was demolished, by the time of a 2015 NIAH survey, the only material fabric of the structure that remained was the single-bay two-storey entrance arch – then in use as the gateway to an apartment development forecourt.

Anniversary events
On the bicentenary of the premiere of Messiah in 1942, two celebratory performances of the work were held, the first in St Patrick's Cathedral on Monday 13 April 1942, and the second in Christ Church Cathedral on Tuesday 14 April 1942.

Since at least 1992 (the 250th anniversary of the premiere), choirs have marked the occasion of the oratorio's anniversary by singing outside the site of the original Musick Hall in the open air. As of 2007, it was reported by RTÉ that Our Lady's Choral Society (OLCS), an Irish choir composed of members of Catholic church choirs in the Roman Catholic Archdiocese of Dublin, had been marking the anniversary of Messiah's premiere each year in front of the site since 1992. The performance on 13 April 2007 marked the start of a week-long Handel festival in the area and drew a large crowd, who were invited to participate in the singing of the Hallelujah Chorus. In 2013, OLCS performed a free concert, coined as Messiah on the Street, near the site.

References

Notes

Sources 

 
 
 
 

 
 
 
 
 
 
 
 
 
 
 
 
 
 
 
 
 
 
 

Buildings and structures in Dublin (city)
Demolished buildings and structures in Dublin
Theatres in Dublin (city)